"Color Gitano" is the debut single by French singer Kendji Girac, the winner of French season 3 of the French music competition series The Voice: la plus belle voix  broadcast from January 11 to May 10, 2014 as part of Team Mika.

"Color Gitano" is a bilingual song in French and Spanish and is heavily influenced by Andalusian culture and gypsy music tradition.

Chart positions

Weekly charts

Year-end charts

References

2014 debut singles
2014 songs
Mercury Records singles
Kendji Girac songs
Songs written by Renaud Rebillaud